Darrell Hiles (born 10 January 1969) is an Indigenous Australian boxer who competed at the 1988 Seoul Olympics in the featherweight division.

Hiles fought a debuting Kostya Tszyu on March 1, 1992, losing by a first-round knockout at one minute, ten seconds of the bout having started. Hiles eventually retired from professional boxing with a record of 20 wins and 17 losses.

References

1969 births
Indigenous Australian boxers
Olympic boxers of Australia
Boxers at the 1988 Summer Olympics
Indigenous Australian Olympians
Australian male boxers
Living people
Featherweight boxers